Nileshwar Muthappan Madappura is a temple dedicated to the God Sree Muthappan in the town Nileshwar of Kasaragode district, Kerala state, South India. Sree Muthappan is the most popular local god in Kannur district and Kasaragod district of north Kerala.

Muthappan is also the theyyam (Muthappan theyyam) performed in the famous Parassinikkadavu temple.

Myths and Legends about Sree Muthappan

Sree Muthappan is believed to be the personification of two divine figures - Thiruvappana and Vellatom. Fundamentally the dual divine figures Thiruvappana and vellatom are not very different from the Theyyamkaliyattem of the north Malabar region. Though Sree Muthappan represents a single god, it represents two godly figures, Vishnu (with fish-shaped crown) and Shiva (a crescent-shaped crown).

Sri Muthappan as a theyyam is performed year-round whereas other theyyams are seasonal (lasting October to May).

Several Muthappan Temples are seen in different parts of Kannur and Kasaragod district. This shows the popularity of the God in the minds of the people of these two districts. Each madappura has its own tradition.

Story of Sree Muthappan Madappura Nileshwar
One interesting story relating to the God Muthappan is about the Nileshwar Muthappan Madappura. The Sree Muthappan temple near National Highway No 17 in Nileshwar has a rich heritage. It tells philosophical, devotional and educational importance of Nileshwar. There is an interesting story regarding the construction of Sree Muthappan Temple. An elder member of the Koroth family regularly visited the place now known as the Muthappan temple and drank madhu (toddy), an intoxicating drink. He was a famous scholar and got the title Ezhuthachan for his commendable achievement as a teacher. Before drinking madhu as a devotee, he poured a few drops of madhu on the nearby jackfruit tree for the god Muthappan. He regularly repeated the practice. Several years after the death of the above-mentioned scholar, the natives experienced serious troubles and they called on an astrologer for assistance. The astrologer revealed that as a result of the regular practice of giving madhu to the god Muthappan, the God started residing there. After the death of the scholar, he did not get the madhu and so started creating disturbances in the area. Then the natives erected a Muthappan temple there. Koroth family got the right of Koymma [patron] in the temple.

As a result of the formation of a committee and the great work done by the members of the committee the temple became famous and daily hundreds of people visited. There is a strong belief that the God will cure all diseases and will give prosperity to the devotees. The devotees will get Payakutti from the temple and stood developing as a great temple like the Sree Muthappan temple at Parassinikadavu.

Muthappan Anthithira
There is a practice of performing Muthappan Anthithira only once in all muthappan temples. Its performance needed lot of money. On 6 January 2008 Muthappan Anthithira was performed in the Nileshwar Muthappan Madappura. The theyyam looks like muthappan in the back and vairajathan in the front.  But it symbolises the God Shiva and Vishnu.  Thousands of people attended the festival and food was served to around one lakh people as prasadam on that occasion.

See also 
 Parassinikkadavu
 Muthappan temple
 Kunnathoor Padi
 Rajarajeshwara Temple
 Sree Muthappan Temple Nileshwar
 Valluvan Kadav Sree Muthappan
 Altharakkal Sree Muthappan Madapura
 Temples of Kerala

External links 
Sree Parassini Muthappan
Sree Muthappan
Sree Muthappan
valluvan kadav sree muthappan
photos of valluvan kadav sree muthappan
valluvan kadav sree muthappan theyyam

Hindu temples in Kasaragod district